Nuke Proof Suit is an EP by British hip hop artist Jehst. This release reveals evidence of a new style in terms of production and lyrics, as the EP takes a more 'catchy' approach with rhythmic hooks and 'Rap-a-long' style rhymes. Jehst confirmed this in an interview with ukhh.com in July 2005, when he described the forthcoming EP as "...more moving it [in] the direction of sound over content in a way."

Track listing
All tracks written by and produced by Jehst with the exception of Pepper Spray which is written by Jehst, Kashmere & Sir Smurf Lil.

 "Vice City"
 "Ape Shit"
 "Nuke Proof Suit"
 "Neck Breakin"
 "Magnum Force"
 "Pepper Spray" Featuring Kashmere and Sir Smurf Lil
 "Hydroblowback"
 "Work Ethic"

References

2005 EPs
Jehst albums